Body Shots is a 1999 American drama film written by David McKenna and directed by Michael Cristofer. It stars Sean Patrick Flanery, Jerry O'Connell, Amanda Peet, Tara Reid and Ron Livingston. It tells the story of eight singles whose night of drunken debauchery goes terribly wrong.

Premise
A group of twenty-somethings are planning on going to a club for a night of fun.  The following morning, Sara (Tara Reid) accuses fellow clubber Mike (Jerry O'Connell) of date rape. The story of the previous evening is then told through two different points of view, one being how Sara remembers it, and the other how Mike remembers.

Cast
 Sean Patrick Flanery as Rick Hamilton
 Jerry O'Connell as Michael Penorisi
 Amanda Peet as Jane Bannister
 Tara Reid as Sara Olswang
 Ron Livingston as Trent
 Emily Procter as Whitney Bryant
 Brad Rowe as Shawn Denigan
 Sybil Temtchine as Emma Cooper

Production
Tara Reid said the only reason she did a nude scene in this movie was because her character was getting raped: "I'd never do a scene where my character takes off her shirt for no reason, for just a little T&A. That's stupid. That's exploiting yourself. I pass on a lot of movies where they want me to do nude stuff where it's not necessary for the role. It makes a film cheesy."

Reception
The film was critically panned. Rotten Tomatoes gives the film a score of 11% based on reviews from 28 critics. On Metacritic the film has a score of 36% based on reviews from 29 critics.

References

External links
 
 
 

1999 drama films
1999 films
American drama films
Films scored by Mark Isham
Films directed by Michael Cristofer
1999 directorial debut films
1990s English-language films
1990s American films
English-language drama films